The Financial Services functional constituency is a functional constituency in the elections for the Legislative Council of Hong Kong first created in 1991. The constituency is composed of 760 financial services participants. These are, specifically, corporate members of the Chinese Gold and Silver Exchange Society entitled to vote at general meetings, and participants of other exchange societies.

Return members

Electoral results

2020s

2010s

2000s

1990s

References

Constituencies of Hong Kong
Constituencies of Hong Kong Legislative Council
Functional constituencies (Hong Kong)
1991 establishments in Hong Kong
Constituencies established in 1991